Hurricane Florence was a strong, late season hurricane that remained out over the open waters of the Central Atlantic for nearly a week, before being absorbed into a large extratropical cyclone. The system gradually became better organized and was classified a subtropical depression on November 2. The storm intensified into a subtropical storm shortly thereafter before weakening into a tropical depression on the next day.

After gaining tropical characteristics throughout most of the day on November 3, the storm was designated Tropical Depression Eleven. The depression quickly strengthened into Tropical Storm Florence, the sixth named storm of the season. The storm briefly underwent rapid intensification, strengthening into a hurricane, before leveling out as a Category 1 hurricane. Florence was subsequently upgraded to a Category 2 hurricane on November 7. However, a large extratropical cyclone located to the north caused the hurricane to rapidly accelerate, with forward speeds reaching . By the next day, Florence lost its identity, while still producing hurricane-force winds, as it was absorbed by the extratropical cyclone.

Meteorological history

The low gradually detached from the front and began developing convective banding features. The system was not fully tropical as the strongest winds were recorded a couple hundred miles from the center, leading to the system being classified a subtropical cyclone on the morning of November 2. Minor intensification followed shortly after and the subtropical depression was upgraded to a subtropical storm. This was based on ship reports of  sustained winds associated with the system. By November 3, the storm became slightly disorganized and was downgraded to a subtropical depression. By the afternoon, the subtropical system began to undergo a transition from a subtropical system to tropical system.

The depression was upgraded to Tropical Storm Florence the next morning. However, outflow from the storm remained poor as the upper-level low was still interacting with the center of Florence and the storm was still not completely tropical but there was slight improvement. The trend in intensification was forecast to continue and Florence was forecast to become the second hurricane of the season within 12 hours. Late on November 4, Florence was upgraded to a hurricane as a solid area of deep convection developed around the center of circulation. An eye feature also appeared on infrared satellite but was not associated with significant strengthening. Florence slowly intensified as the eye persisted and the structure slightly improved. By the morning of November 6, the eye became less defined and the cloud tops around it warmed. The storm also shifted its forward motion northward as the trough located to the southeast began to move towards the east, moving the steering currents with it. As the low moved further to the east, steering currents in the area of Florence weakened, leading to the storm stalling late on November 6.

By the morning of November 7, the eye began to reappear and the storm turned towards the northwest and the forward motion began to rapidly increase. By the morning of November 8, Florence weakened slightly to Category 1 status. Since the storm was very close to a cold front, Florence was expected to rapidly transition into an extratropical cyclone. Later that morning, Florence was absorbed into the extratropical cyclone while still maintaining hurricane-force winds.

Impact and naming
As Florence remained out over the open waters of the central Atlantic, no effects, damages, or fatalities were reported. No tropical storm watches or warnings were issued, and the storm was never forecast to strike land.

See also

 Other storms of the same name

References

External links
The NHC's Preliminary Report (Tropical Cyclone Report) on Hurricane Florence
The NHC's Public Advisory archive on Hurricane Florence
The NHC's Discussion archive on Hurricane Florence

1994 Atlantic hurricane season
Category 2 Atlantic hurricanes